Gen. Daniel Bissell House (also known as Franklinville Farm or Bissell Manor) is a historic house at 10225 Bellefontaine Road in Bellefontaine Neighbors, Missouri that was the home of Revolutionary War General Daniel Bissell (general).

The Federal style house was built in 1819 and added to the National Register of Historic Places on November 28, 1978.
Optional reference text:

See also
List of the oldest buildings in Missouri

References

		
National Register of Historic Places in St. Louis County, Missouri
Buildings and structures completed in 1819